The Anglican Diocese of Sunyani  is a Ghanaian diocese of the Church of the Province of West Africa, a member church of the worldwide Anglican Communion. The current bishop is Festus Yeboah Asuamah.

References

Anglican dioceses in Ghana
Dioceses of the Church of the Province of West Africa
Dioceses in Ghana
Anglican bishops of Sunyani
Anglican realignment dioceses